Eupanacra micholitzi is a moth of the  family Sphingidae. It is known from Papua New Guinea.

It is similar to Eupanacra pulchella, except for some differences on the lines on the forewing upperside. The hindwing underside inner margin is pale orange. The underside of the thorax and abdomen is white and the abdomen has a broad, brown median line.

References

Eupanacra
Moths described in 1893